The Williams FW31 was a Formula One motor racing car, designed and built by Williams F1. The AT&T Williams team used the FW31 to compete in the 2009 Formula One season. The car was unveiled on 19 January 2009 at the Autódromo Internacional do Algarve circuit in southern Portugal, and was first driven by the team's test driver Nico Hülkenberg. It was a mid-field runner, in contention for points on many occasions when driven by Rosberg, but rarely contending for podiums. Rosberg could have finished in third position at Marina Bay during the 2009 Singapore Grand Prix if he had not run wide on the exit of the pit lane and received a penalty.

Rosberg was criticised for failing to achieve a pole position while topping the times in practices on numerous occasions, notably at the 2009 Brazilian Grand Prix - the Williams cars had excelled during practice sessions in wet conditions, but did not produce the same level of performance in qualifying. While Rosberg often scored points, and elevated the car to a finishing position that it was considered incapable of, Nakajima failed to score a point all season and possibly cost the team a higher position in the championship standings than the seventh place they eventually achieved.

The Williams FW31 was the first British F1 car to use Esso-branded fuel since 1973, as well as the first Williams F1 car to use Mobil 1 lubricants since 1988 season, as they had been using ExxonMobil brands since 1999.

Diffuser controversy 

At the first race of the season, an official complaint was launched by other teams against the rear diffusers of the Williams FW31, Toyota TF109 and the Brawn BGP 001 saying that they were illegal, but after analysing the cars, the FIA reported that the cars were not illegal. The teams appealed and after much deliberating the car were deemed legal by the FIA.

Season review
The Williams FW31 was a slight improvement compared to previous FW28-30 cars as the team tried to get used to the major new rules in 2009. Rosberg proved to be a consistent challenger for points, though he could not clinch a podium finish. It could have been a 2nd consecutive podium finish in Singapore for Rosberg, who was running 3rd before a pit-stop. After the pit-stop, his car ran wide, causing a drive through penalty. The safety car was sent out on track, and he could not serve his penalty until the safety car was called in, ending his chances of a podium finish.

Gallery

Formula One World Championship results 
(key) (results in bold indicate pole position; results in italics indicate fastest lap)

 Driver failed to finish, but was classified as they had completed >90% of the race distance.
 Half points awarded as less than 75% of race distance completed.

Other
The Williams FW31 was featured in the racing simulations F1 2009 and iRacing.

References

External links 

 AT&T Williams F1: Car  – Official team website.

Williams Formula One cars
2009 Formula One season cars